Marshfield High School is a public high school, located in Marshfield, Missouri which is located in Webster County. It is part of the Marshfield R-1 School District and holds grades 912. As of 2012 it contains 956 students and 59 classroom teachers. The current teacher to student ratio is 1:16 which is higher than the Missouri average (1:13).

Athletics
Marshfield High School's official mascot is the blue jay. They are part of the Big 8 Conference. From the late 1980s to the late 90s the Lady Jays basketball team made many state play off runs and seven championship wins under coaches Scott Ballard and Gary  Murphy.

Baseball - Men
Basketball – Men & Women
Cheerleading - Co-ed
Cross Country – Men & Women
Debate - Co-ed
Football - Men
Golf – Men & Women
Competitive Maths - Co-ed
Soccer - Men & Women
Softball - Women
Speech - Co-ed
Swimming - Men & Women
Track and field – Men & Women
Volleyball – Co-ed
Wrestling - Men
(2012-2013) Archery - Men & Women

Notable alumni

Leah Johnson, head volleyball coach at Michigan State University

References

 "Marshfield High School - Marshfield, Missouri - MO - School overview". GreatSchools. Retrieved 2010-11-22.

External links 
 Marshfield High School data

Educational institutions established in 2001
Public high schools in Missouri
Schools in Webster County, Missouri
2001 establishments in Missouri